Tongi–Manikganj–Paturia Ghat line is a proposed railway line between Tongi and Paturia Ghat, Manikganj District.

History
The residents of Manikganj district have been appealing to the government for establishing rail link between Manikganj district and Dhaka for quite some time. In 2019, Bangladesh Railways decided to check the feasibility of this railway project and held several meetings for this purpose. In 2021, the Bangladesh government included this railway line in the priority project. In April 2022, the proposed project was recommended to the Planning Commission to approve the feasibility study. According to the proposal of the Ministry of Railways, the railway line will start from Tongi and enter Manikganj District and pass through Manikganj to Paturia Ghat. Besides, a branch line of this railway line will go up to Keraniganj railway station via Nimtoli of Keraniganj Upazila.

References

Tongi
Gazipur Sadar Upazila
Dhaka District
Manikganj District
Dual gauge railways in Bangladesh
Proposed railway lines in Asia